Scott Mathie (born 1 February 1983 in Durban, South Africa) is a former rugby union player that played as a scrum-half. He retired in October 2013. He is the current head coach of the New England Free Jacks in Major League Rugby (MLR).

Professional career
He made 23 appearances for them in 2012 and 2013. He was initially named in the  squad for the 2013 Super Rugby season, but was later released to the 2013 Vodacom Cup squad.

Coaching career
He was appointed assistant coach of the Griquas under Brent Ranse van Rensburg. He was further appointed as Head coach of the Griquas for the 2020-2021 season on the 5 September 2019.

He was appointed as head coach of the New England Free Jacks for the 2022 season on 9 September 2021.

References

1983 births
Living people
South African people of British descent
South African rugby union players
Rugby union scrum-halves
Eastern Province Elephants players
Sharks (rugby union) players
Sharks (Currie Cup) players
Blue Bulls players
Rugby union players from Durban